Alise Gaiķe (born 6 February 2001) is a Latvian footballer who plays as a defender for SK Super Nova and the Latvia women's national team.

References

2001 births
Living people
Latvian women's footballers
Women's association football defenders
Latvia women's youth international footballers
Latvia women's international footballers